The Blind is an epithet for:

 Béla II of Hungary (c. 1110–1141), King of Hungary and Croatia
 Rudolf II, Count Palatine of the Rhine (1306–1353)
 Bogdan III the One-Eyed (1479–1517), also known as the Blind, Voivode of Moldavia
 Didymus the Blind (c. 313–398), Coptic Church theologian
 Henry IV, Count of Luxembourg (c. 1112–1196), also Count of Namur
 Inal the Great of Circassia (died 1458), supreme prince of Circassia
 Isaac the Blind (c. 1160–1235), Jewish writer and rabbi
 John of Bohemia (1296–1346), Count of Luxembourg, King of Bohemia and titular King of Poland
 Louis the Blind (c. 880–928), King of Provence, King of Italy and briefly Holy Roman Emperor
 Magnus IV of Norway (c. 1115–1139), King of Norway
 Sitric Cáech (died 927), Viking leader who ruled Dublin and then Viking Northumbria 
 Theodosius III of Abkhazia, King of the Abkhazians from c. 975 to 978
 Vasily II of Moscow (1415–1462), Grand Prince of Moscow

See also
 List of people known as the One-Eyed

Lists of people by epithet